This article shows all participating team squads at the 2018 Men's European Water Polo Championship, held in Spain from 16 to 28 July 2018.

Ages as of 16 July 2018.

Group A

Georgia
Head coach: Revaz Chomakhidze

Germany
Head coach: Hagen Stamm

Hungary
Head coach: Tamás Märcz

Italy
Head coach: Alessandro Campagna

Group B

France
Head coach: Nenad Vukanić

Malta
Head coach: Karl Izzo

Montenegro
Head coach: Vladimir Gojković

Spain
Head coach: David Martín

Group C

Croatia
Head coach: Ivica Tucak

Greece
Head coach: Thodoris Vlachos

Netherlands
Head coach: Robin van Galen

Turkey
Head coach: Sinan Turunç

Group D

Romania
Head coach: Dejan Stanojević

Russia
Head coach: Sergey Yevstigneyev

Serbia
Head coach: Dejan Savić

Slovakia
Head coach: Peter Nižný

References

Men
Men's European Water Polo Championship
European Water Polo Championship squads